"Goosebumpz" is a song by American hip hop recording artist Mac Miller. It was released on May 28, 2013, as a promotional single from his second studio album Watching Movies with the Sound Off (2013). The song was produced by American producer Diplo. "Goosebumpz" peaked at number 43 on the US Billboard Hot R&B/Hip-Hop Songs chart.

Background
"Goosebumpz" produced by Diplo would be released as the third single from his second studio album Watching Movies with the Sound Off on May 28, 2013 along with the preorder of the album.

Track listing
 Digital single

Charts

Release history

References

2013 singles
2013 songs
Mac Miller songs
Rostrum Records singles
Song recordings produced by Diplo
Songs written by Diplo
Songs written by Mac Miller